The Ellen Show is an American television sitcom created by and starring Ellen DeGeneres that was broadcast during the 2001–02 season on CBS, aired from September 24, 2001, to January 11, 2002. It was DeGeneres' second attempt at a sitcom, following Ellen on ABC (1994–98), but it was unable to attract strong ratings and was quickly cancelled after 13 episodes, leaving 5 episodes unaired.

DeGeneres came out as a lesbian in Ellen, and her character on The Ellen Show, Ellen Richmond, was also a lesbian, although the show did not focus as heavily on the character's sexuality unlike the final season of her first sitcom.

The Ellen Show also starred Cloris Leachman, Martin Mull, Kerri Kenney, Jim Gaffigan, and Emily Rutherfurd.

Plot
After her internet company Homelearn.com goes bankrupt, Ellen Richmond decides to move back to her hometown to live with her eccentric mother, Dot, and scatter-brained sister, Catherine. At home, Ellen becomes reacquainted with her senior prom date, Rusty, who thinks they can pick up where they left off (which, since she is a lesbian, seems unlikely), and her befuddled high school teacher, Mr. Munn. Though worlds apart from the people who love her, Ellen begins to adjust to a very different way of life and takes a job as a guidance counselor at her former high school.

Cast

Main
Ellen DeGeneres as Ellen Richmond
Jim Gaffigan as Rusty Carnouk
Emily Rutherfurd as Catherine Richmond
Martin Mull as Ed Munn
Kerri Kenney as Pam
Cloris Leachman as Dot Richmond
Diane Delano as Bunny Hoppstetter

Guest stars
 Jennifer Irwin as Meg (episode: "Pilot")
 Regan Burns as Officer "B" Arthur (episodes: "Walden Pond", "Joe"")
 John Francis Daley as Erik (episode: "Walden Pond")
 Susan Yeagley as Waitress (episode: "Chain Reaction")
 Marissa Jaret Winokur as Tina (episode: "Vanity Hair")
 Tom Poston as Joe (episode: "Joe")
 Betty White as Mrs. Gibson (episode: "Missing the Bus")
 Dakota Fanning as Young Ellen (episode: "Missing the Bus")
 Mary Tyler Moore as Aunt Mary (episode: "Ellen's First Christmess")
 Ed Asner as Santa Claus (episode: "Ellen's First Christmess")
 John Ritter as Percy Moss (episode: "Gathering Moss")
 Maureen McCormick as Rita Carter (episode: "Shallow Gal")
 Kaley Cuoco as Vanessa Carter (episode: "Shallow Gal")

Production
The show was created by Carol Leifer and Mitchell Hurwitz, who co-wrote the pilot episode. The original title was Ellen Again.

Episodes
The Ellen Show produced 18 episodes, but was canceled mid-way through its season. The final 5 episodes were never broadcast, but are available on DVD.

Home media and streaming
Sony Pictures Home Entertainment released the complete series on DVD in Region 1 in a 2-disc box set on July 11, 2006.

In 2014, Mill Creek Entertainment acquired the rights to the series and subsequently re-released the complete series on February 4, 2014.

Paramount Pictures Home Entertainment, in partnership with CBS Home Entertainment, owns the international rights. The complete series was released in Region 4 (Australia) as a 2 DVD set on February 1, 2017 by Umbrella Entertainment.

All episodes can be seen for free on Crackle.

References

External links

2001 American television series debuts
2002 American television series endings
2000s American sitcoms
CBS original programming
Television series by CBS Studios
Television series by Sony Pictures Television
2000s American LGBT-related comedy television series
English-language television shows
Television shows set in Los Angeles
Television series created by Mitchell Hurwitz
Television series created by Ellen DeGeneres
American LGBT-related sitcoms